Jo Hye-ryun (born May 29, 1970), is a South Korean comedian. She is a former cast member in the variety show Law of the Jungle W.

In 1992, through 《KBS University Gag Festival》, she debuted with the Rookie of the Year Award at the Comedy Awards. She is the first Korean comedian to enter Japan, and she is currently only active in Korea. Her agency is JoyCultures. Her stage name in Japan is “Heryeon (ヘ リ ョ ン)”. Her main building is Ham-an, and she was born in Goseong-gun, Gyeongsangnam-do, and grew up in Anyang-si, Gyeonggi-do. Her current residence is Songdo-dong, Yeonsu-gu, Incheon Metropolitan City.

Filmography

Television shows

Awards and nominations
Won Best TV Star Award at the 2010 SBS Entertainment Awards

References

External links
 

1970 births
Living people
South Korean women comedians
South Korean television actresses
South Korean television presenters
South Korean women television presenters
South Korean women pop singers
Hanyang University alumni
21st-century South Korean singers
21st-century South Korean women singers
Best Variety Performer Female Paeksang Arts Award (television) winners